Ray Bryant Plays is an album recorded by American jazz pianist Ray Bryant recorded in 1959 for the Signature label.

Reception 

Allmusic awarded the album 3 stars calling it "a strong sampling of Ray Bryant's accessible playing during his early period".

Track listing 
 "Delauney's Dilemma" (John Lewis) – 2:35
 "Blue Monk" (Thelonious Monk) – 5:00
 "Misty" (Erroll Garner) – 2:59
 "Sneaking Around" (Ray Bryant) – 3:46
 "Now's the Time" (Charlie Parker) – 4:00
 "Wheatleigh Hall" (Dizzy Gillespie) – 3:55
 "Doodlin'" (Horace Silver) – 4:05
 "A Hundred Dreams from Now" (Duke Ellington) – 3:20
 "Bags' Groove" (Milt Jackson) – 5:34
 "Walkin'" (Richard Carpenter) – 3:08
 "Take the "A" Train" (Billy Strayhorn) – 3:50
 "Whisper Not" (Benny Golson) – 3:35
Recorded in NYC on October 29 (tracks 1 & 5–7), November 5, (tracks 2, 3, 10 & 12), and November 6, 1959 (tracks 4, 8, 9 & 11)

Personnel 
Ray Bryant – piano
Tommy Bryant – bass
Oliver Jackson – drums

References 

1960 albums
Ray Bryant albums
Signature Records albums
Albums produced by Bob Thiele